Delph Locks or the Delph Nine are a series of eight (originally nine) narrow canal locks on the Dudley No. 1 Canal in Brierley Hill, in the West Midlands, England. They were opened in 1779, and reopened in 1967 following restoration of the Dudley Canal and the Stourbridge Canal in a joint venture between the Staffordshire and Worcestershire Canal Society and the British Waterways Board.

History
The Dudley Canal and the Stourbridge Canal were originally planned as a single canal, for which a bill was submitted to Parliament in the spring of 1775. It was opposed by the Birmingham Canal Navigations, and so the project was split in two and resubmitted. Despite continued opposition by the Birmingham Canal, both canals were authorised by separate Acts of Parliament on 2 April 1776. 

Engineer Thomas Dadford was responsible for the construction of the Dudley Canal, which terminated at a flight of nine locks at its southern end. Construction was finished in June 1779, but the locks saw little use until the opening of the Stourbridge Canal, which took place in December. Dadford's son, also called Thomas, was engineer for the Stourbridge Canal. In 1787, discussions took place about amalgamating the two companies, but they remained separate, although they always worked closely together.

The bottom lock at Black Delph Bridge is at the termination of the Dudley Canal and forms the boundary with the Stourbridge Canal. The flight has distinctive waterfall overflow weirs, and rises from the  Stourbridge level to the  level of the Dudley No. 1 canal. The middle seven of the original 1779 locks were rebuilt in 1858 as six new locks, reducing the flight to eight. Some ruins of the old locks are visible to the side of the new.

The two canals ceased to carry commercial traffic, and by the early 1950s were unusable. The Inland Waterways Protection Society put forward a case for restoring the Dudley and Stourbridge Canals in 1959, but Dudley Tunnel to the north was officially closed in 1962. However, in 1964 the British Waterways Board and the Staffordshire and Worcestershire Canal Society agreed to work on restoring both canals, and this early example of co-operation resulted in the locks reopening in 1967.

Location
The Delph Locks and surrounding land form the Delph 'Nine' Locks Conservation Area, Brierley Hill, Metropolitan Borough of Dudley. An iron roving bridge manufactured by Horsley Ironworks stands near the top lock, while the original lock-keeper's house, built in 1779 and modified in the nineteenth century, is a grade II listed structure, as it is one of only a few surviving houses of its type.

From the bottom of the flight, the Stourbridge Canal is level for the same distance to Leys Junction, where the Fens Branch heads to the north east and the Fens Pools reservoirs, while the main line descends  through a flight of sixteen locks.

See also

Canals of the United Kingdom
History of the British canal system

Bibliography

References

External links
Grade II, historicengland.org.uk. Accessed 11 December 2022.

Birmingham Canal Navigations
Canals in the West Midlands (county)
Lock flights of England
Brierley Hill